Heaven Tonight is a 1990 Australian film.

Plot
An ageing rock star (John Waters) tries to make a comeback and is jealous about the success of his son (Guy Pearce).

Production
Writer-producer Frank Howson later claimed that "every incident" in the film was true: "either I have lived it, or I know somebody who has. There is no fabrication, except in the names, which have been changed to protect the guilty." Waters and Pearce were cast for their singing talent as well as their acting skills, and Pearce released a single, "Call of the Wild", from the film.

Release
The film was not a commercial success and only ran for two weeks in cinemas in Sydney and Melbourne.

Cultural references
The film provided comedic material for the 2006-2007 Austereo radio comedy show Get This. Host Tony Martin referred to the film on a number of occasions, making jibes at the name of Guy Pearce's character's band which was 'Video Rodney', the frequent references to the film's villain whose name was the ill-chosen 'Tim Robbins' and the dated 1980s synth-rock music.

References

External links

Heaven Tonight at Oz Movies

Australian musical drama films
1990 films
1990s English-language films
1990s Australian films